Kurbanov, Kurbanow, Kurbonov or Qurbonov is a masculine surname common in the southern parts of the former Soviet Union; its feminine counterpart is Kurbanova, Kurbanowa, Kurbonova or Qurbonova. It may refer to:

Akhmed Kurbanov (born 1986), Russian football player
Bakhodir Kurbanov (born 1972), Uzbekistani wrestler
Bakhodir Kurbanov (general)
Çarymyrat Kurbanow (born 1977), Turkmenian, football referee
Hadisa Qurbonova (born 1940), Tajikistani poet and playwright
Igor Kurbanov (born 1993), Russian football defender
Jahon Qurbonov (born 1986), Tajikistani boxer
Karomatullo Qurbonov (1961–1992), Tajikistani pop singer and composer 
Kurban Kurbanov (born 1985), Uzbekistani freestyle wrestler 
Magomed Kurbanov (footballer) (born 1992), Ukrainian-Russian-Azerbaijani football player
Magomed Kurbanov (born 1995), Russian boxer from Dagestan
Mukhtor Kurbonov (born 1975), Uzbek football player and coach
Murad Kurbanov (born 1992), Russian football player
Nikita Kurbanov (born 1986), Russian basketball player 
Negmatullo Kurbanov (born 1963), Tajikistani general 
Nurkhon Kurbanova (born 1994), Uzbekistani Paralympic athlete
Rashid Kurbanov (born 1987), Uzbekistani-Russian freestyle wrestler
Rizvan Kurbanov (born 1961), Russian politician
Ruslan Kurbanov (disambiguation) – several people
Shamil Kurbanov (born 1993), Russian football defender
Shohrat Kurbanov (born 1971), Turkmen boxer
Utkir Kurbanov (born 1983), Uzbekistani judoka
Aydogdy Kurbanov (born 1978), Turkmenistani archeologist and historian